The North Bay-Mattawa Conservation Authority (NBMCA) is one of 36 conservation authorities in Ontario, Canada consisting of 16 Conservation Areas. 

It is responsible for conservation areas within North Bay, but also extending into the surrounding municipalities. In addition to Conservation Areas, the NBMCA has local jurisdiction in 4 program areas: environmental planning review & watershed management, on-site sewage inspection under the Ontario Building Code, environmental education, and source water protection.

Conservation areas
The North Bay-Mattawa Conservation Authority manages seven conservation areas and one nature preserve.

Corbeil Conservation Area
Eau Claire Gorge Conservation Area
La Vase Portage Conservation Area
Laurentian Escarpment Conservation Area
Laurier Woods Conservation Area
Powassan Mountain Conservation Area
Shields McLaren Conservation Area
JP Webster Nature Preserve

References

External links 
 nbmca.on.ca - Official Website
 Actforcleanwater.ca - NBM Source Water Protection Website
 Conservation Ontario website

Conservation authorities in Ontario
North Bay, Ontario
Mattawa, Ontario